The 2016–17 Pro Basketball League (PBL), for sponsorship reasons the EuroMillions Basketball League, season was the 90th season of the first tier of basketball in Belgium. The defending champion was Oostende, which successfully defended its title.

On September 4, it was announced that the new name of the league would be EuroMillions Basketball League.

Teams
VOO Wolves Verviers-Pepinster withdrew from the league, because of a financial disability to participate.

Arenas and locations

Personnel and sponsors

Regular season

League table

Playoffs
The quarterfinals were played in a best-of-three format, while the semifinals and finals were played in a best-of-five playoff format. The higher seeded teams played the first, third and fifth game of the series at home.

Final standings

Awards

Most Valuable Player
 Jason Clark – Port of Antwerp Giants

Star of the Coaches
 Seth Tuttle – Hubo Limburg United

Coach of the Year
 Dario Gjergja – Telenet Oostende

Belgian Player of the Year
 Olivier Troisfontaines – Crelan Okapi Aalstar

Young Player of the Year
 Ismaël Bako – Leuven Bears

References

Basketball League Belgium Division I seasons
Belgian
Lea